Gottlieb (formerly D. Gottlieb & Co.) was an American arcade game corporation based in Chicago, Illinois. It is best known for developing the arcade game Q*bert.

History
The main office and plant was located at 1140-50 N. Kostner Avenue until the early 1970s when a new modern plant and office was located at 165 W. Lake Street in Northlake, IL. A subassembly plant was located in Fargo, ND. The company was established by David Gottlieb in 1927, initially producing pinball machines while later expanding into various other games including pitch-and-bats, bowling games, and eventually video arcade games (notably Reactor and Q*bert and, leading to the demise of Mylstar, M*A*C*H*3.)

Like other manufacturers, Gottlieb first made mechanical pinball machines, including the first successful coin-operated pinball machine Baffle Ball in 1931. Electromechanical machines were produced starting in 1935. The 1947 development of player-actuated, solenoid-driven 2-inch bats called "flippers" revolutionized the industry. Players now had the ability to shoot the ball back up the playfield and get more points. The flippers first appeared on a Gottlieb game called Humpty Dumpty, designed by Harry Mabs. By this time, the games also became noted for their artwork by Roy Parker.

In the late 1950s the company made more widespread use of digital score reels, making multiple player games more practical as most scoring was expressed by cluttered series of lights in the back box. The score reels eventually appeared on single-player games, now known as "wedgeheads" because of their distinctive tapering back box shape. By the 1970s the artwork on Gottlieb games was almost always by Gordon Morison, and the company had begun designing their games with longer 3-inch flippers, now the industry standard.

The company made the move into solid state machines starting in the late 1970s. The first few of these were remakes of electromechanical machines such as Joker Poker and Charlie's Angels. By that time, multiple player machines were more the mode and wedgeheads were no longer being produced. The last wedgehead was T.K.O. (1979) and the last single player machine was Asteroid Annie and The Aliens (1980).

Gottlieb was bought by Columbia Pictures in 1976. Gottlieb released Q*bert in 1982, which would become immensely successful and is an icon of the golden age of arcade games. In 1983, after the Coca-Cola Company had acquired Columbia, Gottlieb was renamed Mylstar Electronics, but this proved to be short-lived. By 1984 the video game industry in North America was in the middle of a shakeout and Columbia closed down Mylstar at the end of September 1984.  A management group, led by Gilbert G. Pollock, purchased Mylstar's pinball assets in October 1984 and continued the manufacture of pinball machines under a new company, Premier Technology.  As a result of this a number of prototype Mylstar arcade games, which were not purchased by the investors, were never released. Premier did go on to produce one last arcade game, 1989's Exterminator.  Premier Technology, which returned to selling pinball machines under the name Gottlieb after the purchase, continued in operation until the summer of 1996.

Gottlieb's most popular pinball machine was Baffle Ball (released mid-1931), and their final machine was Barb Wire (early 1996).

Licensing and rights
The 1965 machine Gottlieb's Kings & Queens is the one played by the title character in the 1975 rock opera movie Tommy about a psychosomatically blind, deaf, and mute pinball wizard. Today, Gottlieb's pinball machines (along with those distributed under the Mylstar and Premier names), as well as the "Gottlieb" and "D. Gottlieb & Co." trademarks (USPTO registration nos. 1403592, 2292766, and 3288024, and other numbers in countries around the world), are owned by Gottlieb Development LLC of Pelham Manor, New York. Most of Gottlieb and Mystar's video games are currently owned by Columbia Pictures.

Gottlieb video games

Published
 No Man's Land (1980) – licensed from Universal
 New York! New York! (1981) – licensed from Sigma Enterprises
 Reactor (1982)
 Q*bert (1982)
 Mad Planets (1983)
 Krull (1983)
 Juno First (1983) – licensed from Konami
 M.A.C.H. 3 (1983) – laserdisc game; published under Mylstar name
 Us vs. Them (1984) – laserdisc game; published under Mylstar name
 The Three Stooges In Brides Is Brides (1984) – published under Mylstar name
 Q*bert Qubes (1983) – published under Mylstar name
 Curve Ball (1984) – published under Mylstar name
 Exterminator (1989) – published under Premier Technology name

Unreleased prototypes
 Gridlee (1982) – licensed from Videa, Inc.
 Argus (1982) – a.k.a. Videoman, Protector and Guardian
 Insector (1982)
 Arena (1982) – An earlier and simpler version of what became Wiz Warz
 Quizimodo (1982)
 Knightmare (1983)
 Faster, Harder, More Challenging Q*bert (1983) –  developed under Mylstar name
 Screw Loose (1983) – developed under Mylstar name
 Tylz (1984) – developed under Mylstar name
 Video Vince and the Game Factory (1984) – developed under Mylstar name
 Wiz Warz (1984) – developed under Mylstar name

Gottlieb pinball machines

Pure mechanical pinball/bagatelle machines
Incomplete list:
 Bingo (1931)
 Baffle Ball (1931)
 Stop and Sock (1931)
 Mibs (1931)
 Baffle ball senior (baffle ball variant) (1932)
 Play-Boy (1932)
 Brokers Tip  (1933)
 Big Broadcast (1933)
 Sunshine Baseball (1936)
 Sweet Heart  (1954)
 Silver (1957)

Electromechanical pinball/flipperless machines
Incomplete list:
 Relay (1934)
 Playboy (1937)
 Humpty Dumpty #1 (1947)
 Miss America (1947)
 Lady Robin Hood (1947)
 Jack 'n Jill (1948)
 Olde King Cole (1948) 
 K. C. Jones (1949)
 Bank-A-Ball #34 (1950)
 Buffalo Bill (1950)
 Knock Out (1950)
 Triplets #40 (1950)
 Minstrel Man (1951)
 Disc Jockey (1952)
 Happy Go Lucky (1952)
 Skill Pool (1952)
 Queen of Hearts (1952)
 Quartette (1952)
 Quintette (1953)
 Gold Star (1954)
 Dragonette (1954)
 Diamond Lill (1954)
 Hawaiian Beaty (1954)
 Frontiersman (1955)
 Southern Belle (1955)
 Wishing Well #107 (1955)
 Classy Bowler (1956)
 Rainbow (1956)
 Derby Day (1956)
 Harbor Lights (1956)
 Ace High (1957)
 World Champ (1957)
 Brite Star (1958)
 Contest (1958)
 Criss Cross (1958)
 Picnic (1958)
 Rocket Ship (1958)
 Queen of Diamonds (1959)
 Sweet Sioux (1959)
 World Beauties (1959)
 Around the world (1959)
 Dancing Dolls (1960)
 Flipper (1960)
 Texan(1960)
 Foto Finish (1961)
 Corral (1961)
 Cover Girls (1962)
 Flipper Clown (1962)
 Olympics (1962)
 Liberty Belle (1962)
 Rack-A-Ball (1962)
 Sunset (1962)
 Flying Chariots (1963)
 Gigi (1963)
 Slick Chick (1963)
 Sweet Hearts (1963)
 Swing Along (1963)
 North Star (1964)
 Bowling Queen (1964)
 Bonanza (1964)
 Happy Clown (1964)
 Ship Mates (1964)
 World Fair (1964)
 Kings & Queens (1965)
 Sky Line  (1965)
 Paradise 2 player game  (1965)
 Cow Poke (1965)
 Bank-A-Ball (1965)
 Central Park (1966)
 Cross Town / Subway (1966) - last machines with manual ball lift
 Dancing Lady (1966)
 Hawaiian Isle (1966)
 Rancho (1966)
 Hi-Score (1967)
 Sea Side (1967)
 Hit-A-Card (1967)
 Sing Along (1967)
 Super Duo (1967)
 Super Score (1967)
 Surf Side (1967)
 "Four Seasons" (1968)
 Domino (1968)
 Fun Park (1968) Fun Land (1968)
 Paul Bunyan (1968)
 Royal Guard (1968)
 Hi-Lo (1969)
 Airport (1969)
 Road Race (1969)
   Groovy (1970)
 Aquarius (1970)
 Batter Up (1970)
 Flip-A-Card (1970)
 Snow Derby  2 player game (1970)
 Snow Queen  4 player game (1970)
 Dimension (1971)
 PlayBall (1971)
 4 Square (1971)
 2001 #298 (1971)
 Flying Carpet #310 (1972)
 Jungle (1972)
 King Kool (1972)
 Outer Space 2 player game (1972)
 Jumping Jack (2 player)/Jack In The Box (4 player) (1973)
 Jungle King (1 player) (1973)
 Wild Life (2 player) (1973)
 Jungle (4 player) (1973)
 Pro Pool (1973)
 Pro-Football (1973)
 Big Shot 2 player game (1973)Hot Shot 4 player game (1973)
 High Hand (1973)
 Top Card 1 player game (1974)
 Big Indian #356 (1974)
 Far Out 4 player game (1974)
 Duotron 2 player game (1974)
 Magnotron 4 player game (1974)
 Sky Jump (1974)
 Spin Out (1975)
 Super Soccer #367 (1975)
 Quick Draw (1975)
 Fast Draw  #379 (1975)
 Abracadabra #380 (1975)
 Spirit of 76 #381 (1975)
 Spin Out (1975)
 Pioneer #382 (1975)
 "300" #388 (1975)
 Atlantis (1975)
 El Dorado (1975)
 Buccaneer (1976)
 Surf Champ (1976)
 Card Whiz 2 player version of Royal Flush (1976)
 Royal Flush 4 player version of Card Whiz (1976)
 Sure Shot (1976)
 Bank Shot (1976)
 Target Alpha (1976)
 Volley (1976)
 Solar City (1976)
 Bronco 4 player game (1977)
 Golden Arrow (1977)
 Fire Queen 2 player game (1977)
 Jet Spin 4 player game (1977)
 Mustang 2 player game (1977)
 Genie (1977)
 Team One (1977)
 Vulcan 4 player version of Fire Queen (1977)
 Cleopatra (1977)
 Fire Queen (1977)
 Gridiron (1977)
 Jacks Open (1977)
 Lucky Hand (1977)
 Jungle Queen 4 player version of Jungle Princess (1977)
 Jungle Princess (1977)
 Pyramid  (1978)
 Strange World (1978)
 Neptune (1978)
 Sinbad (1978)
 Eye Of The Tiger (1978)
 Poseidon (1978)
 Hit the Deck (1978)
 Joker Poker (1978)
 Close Encounters of the Third Kind (1978)
 Dragon (1978)
 Gemini (1978)
 Rock Star (1978)
 Blue Note (1979)
 T.K.O. (1979)
 Space Walk (1979)

System 1 Pinball Machines

 Cleopatra #409 (1977) (was also released as two EM versions (Cleopatra, 4 player and Pyramid, 2 player))
 Sinbad #412 (1978) (was also released as an EM version)
 Joker Poker #417 (1978) (was also released as an EM version)
 Dragon #419 (1978) (was also released as an EM version)
 Solar Ride #421 (1979) (was also released as an EM version)
 Charlie's Angels #425 (1978) (was also released as an EM version)
 Close Encounters of the Third Kind #424 (1978) - 9,950 Solid State games and 470 Electro-Mechanical games made
 Count-Down #422 (1979) - 9,899 Games made (Also released as a 2 player EM version as Space Walk)
 Pinball Pool #427 (1979) - 7,200 Games made
 Totem #429 (1979) - 6,643 Games made
 The Incredible Hulk #433 (1979) - 6,150 Games made, a few of these games had System 80 electronics to test the new System 80 platform as model #500. 
 Genie #435 (1979) - Wide body game. 6,800 Games made
 Buck Rogers #437 (1980) - 7,410 Games made
 Torch #438 (1980) - 3,880 Games made
 Roller Disco #440 (1980) - Wide body game with bright neon colors. 2,400 games made
 Asteroid Annie and the Aliens #442 (1980) - (The only single player System 1 Pinball Game and also the last System 1 game!) Only 211 games made

System 80 pinball machines
 Panthera  #652 (1980)
 The Amazing Spider-Man #653 (1980)
 Circus #654 (1980)
 Counterforce #656 (1980)
 Star Race #657 (1980)
 James Bond 007 #658 (1980)
 Time Line #659 (1980)
 Force II #661 (1981)
 Pink Panther #664 (1981)
 Mars God of War #666 (1981)
 Volcano #667 (1981)
 Black Hole #668 (1981)
 Haunted House #669 (1982)
 Eclipse #671 (1982)

System 80A pinball machines
 Devil's Dare #670 (1982)
 Rocky #672 (1982)
 Spirit #673 (1982)
 Punk! #674 (1982)
 Caveman #PV810 (1982) (features an additional video game screen and a joystick)
 Striker #675 (1982)
 Krull #676 (1983)
 Q*bert's Quest #677 (1983) – based on the Q*bert video game
 Super Orbit #680 (1983)
 Royal Flush Deluxe #681 (1983)
 Goin' Nuts #682 (1983)
 Amazon Hunt #684 (1983)
 Rack 'Em Up! #685 (1983)
 Ready...Aim...Fire! #686 (1983)
 Jacks to Open #687 (1984)
 Touchdown #688 (1984)
 Alien Star #689A (1984)
 The Games #691 (1984)
 El Dorado City of Gold #692 (1984)
 Ice Fever #695 (1985)

System 80B pinball machines
 Bounty Hunter #694 (1985)
 Chicago Cubs Triple Play #696 (1985)
 Rock #697 (1985)
 Tag-Team Pinball #698 (1985)
 Ace High #700 (1985) – never produced
 Raven #702 (1986)
 Hollywood Heat #703 (1986)
 Rock Encore #704 (1986) – conversion kit for Rock Genesis #705 (1986)
 Spring Break #706 (1987)
 Gold Wings #707 (1986)
 Monte Carlo #708 (1987)
 Arena #709 (1987)
 Victory #710 (1987)
 Diamond Lady #711 (1988)
 TX-Sector #712 (1988)
 Big House #713 (1988)
 Robo-War #714 (1988)
 Excalibur #715 (1988)
 Bad Girls #717 (1988)
 Hot Shots #718 (1989)
 Bone Busters, Inc. #719 (1989)

System 3 pinball machines
 Lights...Camera...Action! #720 (1989)
 Silver Slugger #722 (1990)
 Vegas #723 (1990)
 Deadly Weapon #724 (1990)
 Title Fight #726 (1990)
 Car Hop #725 (1991)
 Hoops #727 (1991)
 Cactus Jack's #729 (1991)
 Class of 1812 #730 (1991)
 Amazon Hunt III #684D (1991) – conversion kit
 Surf 'N Safari #731 (1991)
 Operation Thunder #732 (1992) – last Gottlieb machine to use an alphanumeric display
 Super Mario Bros. #733 (1992) – Based on the Super Mario Bros. video game by Nintendo; first Gottlieb machine to use a dot-matrix display (DMD). It was one of America's top ten best-selling pinball machines of 1992, receiving a Gold Award from the American Amusement Machine Association (AAMA).
 Super Mario Bros. - Mushroom World #N105 (1992)
 Cue Ball Wizard #734 (1992)
 Street Fighter II #735 (1993) – based on the Street Fighter II video game by Capcom; in 1995–1996, pinball machines were produced under the name Capcom, originally were made in the Gottlieb factory
 Tee'd Off #736 (1993)
 Gladiators #737 (1993)
 Wipe Out #738 (1993)
 Rescue 911 #740 (1994)
 World Challenge Soccer #741 (1994)
 Stargate #742 (1995) – based on the Stargate movie
 Shaq Attaq #743 (1995) – starring Shaquille O'Neal
 Freddy: A Nightmare on Elm Street #744 (1994) – based on the A Nightmare on Elm Street movie series
 Frank Thomas' Big Hurt #745 (1995)
 Waterworld #746 (1995) – based on the Waterworld movie
 Mario Andretti #747 (1995) – starring Mario Andretti
 Strikes 'n' Spares (1995)
 Barb Wire (pinball) #748 (1996) – based upon the Barb Wire film and comic
 Brooks N' Dunn #749 – This game was entering production just as Gottlieb shut down and ceased operations. Two prototype machines supposedly exist, although some claim the design never proceeded past the whitewood stage. Playfield components, such as plastics, ramps, mechanisms and Translites were produced for the games about to enter production; enough for about 10 games to exist. Only buggy prototype software exists and was never completed.

Gottlieb was last to introduce a solid-state system, and last to cease manufacture of electromechanical games.  The first version of Gottlieb's solid state pinball hardware was called System 1, and had  many undocumented features. Designed and developed by Rockwell International's Microelectronics Group of Newport Beach, CA with circuit board manufacturing and final assembly in El Paso, Texas. Likely it was rushed to compete with the new solid-state games from other manufacturers, particularly Bally.   An entirely new platform was produced in 1980, System 80, which was refined in System 80A and System 80B. Following the System 80 platform, a new platform named System 3'' was first released in 1989 and was used until the company's closure.

See also
 Ed Krynski

References

External links
Internet Pinball Database showing complete listing of Gottlieb pinball games
Stork's Nest Pins: A guide about Gottlieb's System 80 pinballs
Freddy Nightmare on Elm Street Pinball resource site
Gottlieb Development LLC

 
Columbia Pictures
Defunct video game companies of the United States
Manufacturing companies based in Chicago
Pinball manufacturers
1927 establishments in Illinois
American companies established in 1927
Manufacturing companies established in 1927